Brother Phelps was an American country music duo formed by brothers Ricky Lee (guitar, vocals) and Doug Phelps (bass guitar, vocals). Prior to the duo's formation in 1992, both brothers were members of The Kentucky Headhunters, a Southern rock-influenced country rock band. In 1993, Brother Phelps charted with its debut single "Let Go", which reached a peak of No. 6 on the Billboard country music charts. In all, the duo charted six singles between 1993 and 1995 (although only one other single reached Top 40), in addition to recording two albums on Asylum Records. Brother Phelps disbanded in 1995, with Doug rejoining the Kentucky Headhunters as lead singer, and Ricky Lee assuming a solo career.

Biography
The Brothers are Ricky Lee Phelps, who was born in 1953 Edmonton, Kentucky, and Doug Phelps who was born in Leachville, Arkansas, in 1960. They were raised in the Missouri Bootheel and Doug graduated from a small school named Southland in Cardwell, Missouri. They joined The Kentucky Headhunters in 1986. Ricky Lee served as lead vocalist, while Doug played bass guitar and sang backup vocals. The Kentucky Headhunters released its debut album, Pickin' on Nashville, in 1989, producing four Top 40 singles on the country charts with it. After the band's second album, 1991's Electric Barnyard, failed to produce a major hit, Ricky Lee and Doug announced that they were leaving to form their own group. Mark Orr then became lead singer of The Kentucky Headhunters, while Anthony Kenney took over as bass guitarist.

The newly formed duo (named Brother Phelps, after Ricky Lee and Doug's minister father), signed to Asylum Records in 1992. Unlike the country rock sounds of The Kentucky Headhunters, Brother Phelps featured a more traditional country music sound. Their first single, "Let Go", reached a peak of No. 6 on the Billboard Hot Country Singles & Tracks charts in 1993, higher than any of The Kentucky Headhunters' singles had peaked. The same year, the duo's first album (also titled Let Go) was released.

Brother Phelps' second and final album, Any Way the Wind Blows (its title track a J. J. Cale cover), was released in 1995 to critical acclaim, although it failed to produce any Top 40 singles. The duo disbanded in 1995, with Doug returning to the Kentucky Headhunters, assuming the role of lead vocalist after Orr's departure. Ricky Lee, meanwhile, continued to record as a solo artist.

Discography

Albums

Singles

Music videos

Awards & Nominations

Nominations
Country Music Association
 1994 Vocal Duo of the Year
 1995 Vocal Duo of the Year

References

External links
The Kentucky Headhunters official website
Ricky Lee Phelps official website

Asylum Records artists
Country music duos
Sibling musical duos
Musical groups established in 1992
Country music groups from Kentucky
1992 establishments in Kentucky
1995 disestablishments in Kentucky
Musical groups disestablished in 1995
Edmonton, Kentucky